The Beards may refer to:

The Beards (American band), members include Kim Shattuck
The Beards (Australian band), a folk rock band